The 2016 United States House of Representatives elections in Rhode Island were held on November 8, 2016, to elect the two U.S. representatives from the state of Rhode Island, one from each of the state's 2 congressional districts. The elections coincided with the 2016 U.S. presidential election, as well as other elections to the House of Representatives, elections to the United States Senate and various state and local elections. The primaries took place on September 13.

District 1

Democratic primary

Candidates

Declared
David Cicilline, incumbent U.S. Representative

Declined
Angel Taveras, former mayor of Providence, Rhode Island

Results

Republican primary

Candidates

Declared
H. Russell Taub, conservative activist

Declined
Karen MacBeth, state representative

Results

Official campaign websites
David Cicilline for Congress
H. Russell Taub for Congress

General election

Results

District 2

Democratic primary

Candidates

Declared
James Langevin, incumbent U.S. Representative
John Hamilton, former State Representative (1980-84), Delegate to the 2016 Democratic National Convention for Bernie Sanders
Steven Archer, a former Republican and military veteran, former candidate for State Senate in 2014

Langevin defeated both primary challengers handily, with 64.9% of the vote to Archer's 18.8% and Hamilton's 16.8% in the September 13 primary.

Results

Republican primary
Rhue R. Reis, Republican nominee for this seat in 2014

Reis was unopposed for the Republican nomination.

Results

Independent candidates
Salvatore Caiozzo, small business owner, military veteran, and activist, founder of poisonedveterans.org
Jeffrey Johnson, a high school biology teacher and climate change activist, former Green Party candidate for lieutenant governor in 1994, and for State Representative in 1998 and 2000

Official campaign websites
James Langevin for U.S. Congress
Elect Rhue Reis U.S. Congress
Jeff Johnson 
Rhode Island First (Caiozzo)
John Hamilton for Congress
Archer for Congress

General election

Results

See also
 United States House of Representatives elections, 2016
 United States elections, 2016

References

Rhode Island
2016
2016 Rhode Island elections